Tiger Force was the name of a long-range reconnaissance patrol unit of the 1st Battalion (Airborne), 327th Infantry, 1st Brigade (Separate), 101st Airborne Division, which fought in the Vietnam War from November 1965 to November 1967. The unit gained notoriety after investigations during the course of the war and decades afterwards revealed extensive war crimes against civilians, which numbered into the hundreds.

Composition

The platoon-sized unit, approximately 45 paratroopers, was organized by Major David Hackworth in November 1965 to "outguerrilla the guerrillas". Tiger Force (Recon) 1-327th was a highly decorated small unit in Vietnam, and paid for its reputation with heavy casualties. In October 1968, Tiger Force's parent battalion was awarded the Presidential Unit Citation by President Lyndon B. Johnson, which included a mention of Tiger Force's service at Đắk Tô in June 1966.

Investigations of war crimes

On October 19, 2003, Michael D. Sallah, a reporter at The Blade (Toledo) newspaper, obtained unreleased, confidential records of U.S. Army commander Henry Tufts. One file in these records referred to a previously unpublished war crimes investigation known as the Coy Allegation. To investigate this further, Sallah gained access to a large collection of documents produced by the investigation held at the National Archives in College Park, Maryland.

Sallah found that between 1971 and 1975, the Army's Criminal Investigation Command had investigated the Tiger Force unit for alleged war crimes committed between May and November 1967. The documents included sworn statements from many Tiger Force veterans, which detailed war crimes allegedly committed by Tiger Force members during the Song Ve Valley and Operation Wheeler military campaigns. The statements, from both individuals who allegedly participated in the war crimes and those that did not, described war crimes such as the following:

 the routine torture and execution of prisoners
 the routine practice of intentionally killing unarmed Vietnamese villagers including men, women, children, and elderly people
 the routine practice of cutting off and collecting the ears of victims
 the practice of wearing necklaces composed of human ears
 the practice of cutting off and collecting the scalps of victims
 incidents where soldiers planted weapons on murdered Vietnamese villagers
 an incident where a young mother was drugged, raped, and then executed
 an incident where a soldier killed a baby and cut off his or her head after the baby's mother was killed

The investigators concluded that many of the war crimes took place. This included the murder of former-ARVN personnel, the murder of two blind brothers, the crippled and old and the routine murder of women and children. Despite this, the Army decided not to pursue any prosecutions.

Their high bodycounts were recognized and encouraged by military officials. Colonel Morse ordered troops to rack up a body count of 327 casualties in order to match the battalion's infantry designation, 327th; however by the end of the campaign soldiers were congratulated for their 1000th kill. Those killed were listed as enemy combatants.

After studying the documents, Sallah and fellow reporter, Mitch Weiss, located and interviewed dozens of veterans who served in Tiger Force during the period in question as well as the CID investigators who later carried out the Army's inquiry. The reporters also traveled to Vietnam and tracked down numerous residents of Song Ve Valley who identified themselves as witnesses. Sallah and Weiss reported that the war crimes were corroborated by both veterans and Song Ve Valley residents. The reporters also managed to track down dozens of additional investigative records not included in the National Archives.

The reporters published their findings in a series of articles in The Toledo Blade in October 2003. The New York Times subsequently performed their own investigation, contacting a few Tiger Force veterans and corroborating The Toledo Blades findings.

Since The Blades story, the United States Army has opened a review of the former Tiger Force investigation, but has not yet provided much additional information. On May 11, 2004, Lt. Col. Pamela Hart informed The Blade reporters that she had been too busy responding to prisoner abuse by U.S. soldiers in Iraq to check on the status of the Tiger Force case. The Blade has not reported on any more recent updates from the U.S. Army.

Reporters Michael D. Sallah, Mitch Weiss, and Joe Mahr received a number of awards for their series:

 In 2003, the reporters won the IRE Medal.
 In 2003, the reporters won the Sigma Delta Chi Award for investigative reporting, for publications with a circulation of 100,000 or greater.
 In 2004, the reporters won the Taylor Family Award for Fairness in Newspapers.
 In 2004, the reporters won the Pulitzer Prize for Investigative Reporting.

In 2006, Sallah, now an investigative reporter with The Washington Post, and Weiss, an investigative reporter with the Associated Press, co-authored a book chronicling their findings: Tiger Force: A True Story of Men and War (2006).

Notable former members 1965–1969
Lt. Col. David Hackworth, unit founder
Lt. Dennis Foley
Lt. James Hawkins (implicated in leading nearly all controversial events) Hawkins was a Battlefield commissioned Second lieutenant. Hawkins attributes the lack of charges to the timing of the investigation after My Lai and the potential for additional bad "publicity."
Lt. James A. Gardner (awarded the Medal of Honor, posthumously) killed in action, before any of the controversial events
Lt. William F. Kernan
Lt. Donald Wood (whistleblower)
Lt. Skip Franks (whistleblower)
Ssg. John G. Gertsch (awarded the Medal of Honor, posthumously) killed in action
Sgt. Gerald Bruner (whistleblower)
Spc. William Carpenter (whistleblower)
Pvt. Rion Causey (whistleblower)
Pvt. Kenneth Kerney (whistleblower)
Pvt. Sam Ybarra

In popular culture
In the 2014 book Edge of Eternity by Ken Follett, character Jasper Murray is enlisted in the military and assigned to Tiger Force in Vietnam. He witnesses and is forced to participate in several war crimes, such as rape and murder of a Vietnamese family and using Vietnamese peasants as "mine dogs" to detect mines and traps laid by Viet Cong.

See also

Vietnam War
Phoenix Program
Operation Speedy Express
Former United States special operations units
Vietnam War Crimes Working Group Files

Broader, related topics
 Headhunting
 Human trophy collecting
 Medical torture
 Mimizuka
War crimes committed by the United States

References

Further reading
 Sallah, Michael and Mitch Weiss. "Investigators will question ex-GIs about killing spree ." Toledo Blade, 15 February 2004.
 Greiner, Bernd. Krieg ohne Fronten: Die USA in Vietnam. Hamburg: Hamburger Edition, 2007, .

External links
Report at pulitzer.org of award for Toledo Blade articles 
Tiger Force veterans' website
Michael Sallah interviewed on Democracy Now!
Michael Sallah and Mitch Weiss interviewed on NPR's Talk of the Nation
Michael Sallah interviewed on NPR's On The Media
Interview with Sallah and Weiss at the Pritzker Military Library

Military units and formations established in 1965
Military units and formations of the United States Army in the Vietnam War
Anti-communist terrorism
United States war crimes
Vietnam War crimes committed by the United States